"Love Is the Hero" is a song performed by American Rock singer and guitarist Billy Squier, with Freddie Mercury from Queen on backing vocals. It appears as the second track on his fifth studio album Enough Is Enough from 1986.

After a very poorly received video for his hit song "Rock Me Tonite", Squier's career had taken a downturn. As a result, he stopped selling out concerts and his album and singles success waned. "Love Is the Hero" became a commercial disappointment, peaking at #65 in Cash Box magazine and #80 on the Billboard Hot 100 chart. It fared much better on AOR (Album Oriented Rock) radio and received rotation on MTV. It is often deemed one of the best songs from his later career and the standout track of Enough Is Enough.

Mercury originally recorded an intro sung solely by himself, but it was cut from the album and single version. It was kept on the extended 12" version and later restored on Squier's compilation album Reach For the Sky: The Anthology and Mercury's The Solo Collection box set. In the spring of 2021, the aforementioned version was finally released as a digital single.

Personnel 

 Billy Squier - lead vocals, guitars, keyboards
 Freddie Mercury - backing vocals, co-lead vocals, piano (12" version only)
 Bobby Chouinard - drums
 Alan St. Jon - keyboards
 Jeff Golub - guitars
 TM Stevens - bass

References 

1986 songs
1986 singles
Billy Squier songs
Freddie Mercury songs
Songs written by Billy Squier
Song recordings produced by Peter Collins (record producer)